Netaji Subhas Institute of Technology , is a private engineering college located in Bihta, Patna, India offering B.Tech & diploma courses. It is affiliated to Aryabhatta Knowledge University, Patna.
Netaji Subhas Institute of Technology, Bihta has no educational or institutional links with the NSUT(Formerly NSIT), Delhi.

History
NSIT was established in 2007 with the approval of AICTE, Department of Science & Technology, Government of Bihar, State Board of Technical Education and the Magadh University, Bodh Gaya. Following the creation of a technical university in 2008 in Bihar, NSIT's engineering courses are now under Aryabhatta Knowledge University, Patna.

Campus
Campus facilities include faculty and staff residences, student hostels, cooperative mess and a sports complex. The campus has a main administrative block, digital library, laboratories, workshops, auditorium, conference rooms and a modern canteen, wifi.

Programmes
The college offers the following undergraduate courses. The medium of instruction for all courses is Hindi or English.

B.Tech 
B.Tech courses are affiliated to Aryabhatta Knowledge University. The Institute offers 4-year Bachelor of Technology degree programmes in following fields:

Electrical & Electronics Engineering
Computer Engineering
 Electronics And Communication Engineering  
Mechanical Engineering
Civil Engineering

Diploma
Diploma courses are affiliated to State Board of Technical Education. The Institute offers diploma degree programs in following fields:
Mechanical Engineering
Electrical & Electronics Engineering
Civil Engineering
Electrical Engineering
Computer Science and Engineering

See also

 Indian Institute of Technology Patna

References

Memorials to Subhas Chandra Bose
2008 establishments in Bihar
Engineering colleges in Bihar
Educational institutions established in 2007
Universities and colleges in Patna
Colleges affiliated to Aryabhatta Knowledge University